Newell Point is the rocky point forming the northeast extremity of Robert Island in the South Shetland Islands, Antarctica and is a northwest entrance point of Nelson Strait.

The feature originally charted and named 'Newell Point' by Discovery Investigations personnel in 1935 was probably the north extremity of the nearby Tatul Island, the latter only becoming detached from Robert Island as a result of glacier retreat in the late 20th and early 21st century.

Location
Bulgarian mapping in 2009.

See also
 Robert Island
 South Shetland Islands

Maps
 L.L. Ivanov. Antarctica: Livingston Island and Greenwich, Robert, Snow and Smith Islands. Scale 1:120000 topographic map.  Troyan: Manfred Wörner Foundation, 2009.

References
 SCAR Composite Antarctic Gazetteer.

Headlands of Robert Island